The Diggers are a Scottish post-Britpop powerpop band, with a 1997 debut album, Mount Everest.

History
Members Miezitis and Moffatt had attended school together and began playing as an acoustic duo in the early 1990s. In 1991 they moved to Glasgow, and added members Eslick and Ross. After a 1993 car crash, the group was noticed by Martin Carr of The Boo Radleys, who got them signed to Creation Records. They opened for Super Furry Animals on tour in 1997, and released their debut album for Creation, Mount Everest.

The band got their name from the novel Ringolevio by Emmett Grogan.

Moffat went on to run Leith Record Company in Edinburgh.

Members
Chris Miezitis (vocals, guitar)
Alan Moffat (vocals, bass)
John Eslick (guitar)
Hank Ross (drums)

Discography
Mount Everest (Creation Records, 1997)
Nobody's Fool (Three-track CD). Includes "Nobody's Fool", "Life's All Ways" and "Here and There" (Creation Records, 1996)
Peace of Mind (Three-track CD). Includes "Peace of Mind", "Tangled Web" and "Get It Together" (Creation Records, 1996)
O.K. Alright (Three-track CD). Includes "O.K. Alright", "On the Line" and "Holiday Inn" (Creation Records, 1997)

References
Stephen Thomas Erlewine [ The Diggers], AllMusic

Scottish pop music groups